Keira  is a feminine given name. It is an Anglicized version of "Ciara" and means "Little Dark One".

People named Keira include:
Keira Bevan (born 1997), Welsh rugby union player
Keira D'Amato (born 1984), American long-distance runner
Keira Hewatch (born 1985), Nigerian actress
Keira Knightley (born 1985), English actress
Keira Lucchesi (born 1989), Scottish actress
Keira Maameri (born 1980), French film director
Keira McLaughlin (born 2000), Canadian curler
Keira Ramshaw (born 1994), English footballer
Keira Robinson (born 1994), American basketball player
Keira Stephens (born 2003), Australian swimmer
Keira Walsh (born 1997), English footballer
Saint Cera of Ireland, also spelled Keira, 7th-century abbess

Fictional characters include:
Keira, a main character from a 2012 CGI animated film Barbie: The Princess & the Popstar
Keira, a supporting character in the Jak and Daxter series
Keira Metz, a supporting character and love interest in The Witcher universe.

See also
Electoral district of Keira
Kira (given name)
List of Irish-language given names

References

Irish feminine given names